1923 Uruguayan Primera División can refer to:
 1923 Uruguayan Primera División of AUF, Uruguayan championship organized by the Uruguayan Football Association (AUF).
 1923 Uruguayan Primera División of FUF, Uruguayan championship organized by the Uruguayan Football Federation (FUF).